"Only People" is a song written by John Lennon released on his 1973 album Mind Games.

The song is included on the 2010 album, Gimme Some Truth. "Only People" revolves around Lennon's and Ono's personal philosophy. Lennon said that it failed as a song, saying that in an interview with Playboy, "It was a good lick, but I couldn't get the words to make sense."

Personnel
The musicians who performed on the original recording were:
John Lennon – vocals, acoustic guitar
David Spinozza – guitar
Ken Ascher – clavinet, Fender Rhodes electric piano 
Michael Brecker – saxophone
Gordon Edwards – bass guitar
Jim Keltner – drums

References

John Lennon songs
Songs written by John Lennon
1973 songs
Song recordings produced by John Lennon
Plastic Ono Band songs